The Supreme SA Leader, was the titular head of the Nazi Party's paramilitary group, the  (SA).

History

To centralize the loyalty of the SA, Hitler personally assumed command of the entire organization in 1930 and remained  for the duration of the group's existence.

Insignia
The  had no particular uniform insignia and was a paramilitary title that could be denoted in a variety of ways. Göring, for instance, created an elaborate uniform, with swastika armband accompanied with white service stripes.

List of officeholders

|-style="text-align:center;"
| colspan=9| None(November 1923 – 1 November 1926)
|-

See also 
 Stabschef
 Uniforms and insignia of the Sturmabteilung
 List of SS personnel

Notes

References

Bibliography 

Nazi paramilitary ranks
Sturmabteilung